Andrzej Fonfara (21 September 1939 — 18 July 2017), was a Polish ice hockey player. He mainly played for GKS Katowice during his career, as well as the Polish national team at several world championships as well as the 1964 Winter Olympics. He helped Katowice win the Polish league title five times, and later coached the team as well.

References

External links
 

1939 births
2017 deaths
GKS Katowice (ice hockey) players
Ice hockey players at the 1964 Winter Olympics
Olympic ice hockey players of Poland
Polish ice hockey centres
Sportspeople from Katowice